Ischnothele caudata is a spider in the family Ischnothelidae, found from Mexico to Brazil. It was first described in 1875 by Anton Ausserer. Ausserer did not explain the choice of specific name, but the Latin word caudatus means 'tailed'.

References

Mygalomorphae
Spiders of North America
Spiders of South America
Spiders described in 1875